This is a list of Japanese spies including leaders and commanders of the Japanese Secret Intelligence Services (Kempeitai) in the period 1930 to 1945'.

The Emperor of Japan (Tenno) was constitutionally the supreme commander of the Japanese secret services as a branch of the Imperial Armed Forces.
Yakichiro Suma es – Japan's Ambassador in Spain, chief of the Japanese spy network code named "TO". Friend of Foreign Ministers Ramón Serrano Suñer (General Franco's brother-in-law) and Count Gomez Jordana. He collected information from Afghanistan, the Soviet Union, Iran, and India.
Morito Morishima pt – Japanese ambassador in Portugal.
Hiroshi Ōshima – Japanese ambassador in Germany, close friends with Admiral Canaris, chief of Germany's intelligence organization (Abwehr) and Italy's Military Intelligence Bureau. Oshima then relayed TO to Tokyo along with messages coordinating policies and operations between the three Axis powers.
Yoshio Muto – spy operating in San Francisco.
Toshio Miyazaki – Imperial Japanese Navy agent who recruited the American Harry Thomas Thompson as a secret agent in San Diego.
Yuchi Tonogawa – an Imperial Japanese Army agent working undercover as a farm worker in Brazil, also a member of a local secret ring in Brazil.
An Imperial Japanese Army captain working undercover as a chef for a prominent Brazilian family until Brazilian security services detected him.
Jakuji Ochi – an Imperial Japanese Navy agent working undercover as a woodworker in Panama, also chief of a secret ring in Las Perlas Archipelago. Also in Panama were a Japanese family of fishermen who were a supposed part of this web.
Prince Higashikuni – on a secret mission commissioned by Tenno. In 1921, he arranged a secret meeting in Baden-Baden (Germany) with "Three Raven" (a secret military think tank) to organize the underground commission of "Eleven Reliable Men" who gave orders to prepare the future conquest lines of Japanese forces.
Prince Chichibu – with Hirohito's orders, arrived in Manchuria for an underground reconnaissance mission in accordance with secret plans for the Japanese intervention there.
Ryonosuke Seita – chief of a spy ring in Brisbane, Australia. Possibly linked to Pedro de Ygual, Spanish consul in Australia and a known General Franco supporter.
Akashi Motojiro – Black Dragon member and agent specialized in Siberia and North Asia. Knowledgeable about China, Manchuria, Siberia. He established contacts throughout the Muslim world. These Muslim contacts would be maintained throughout World War II, both as operatives in their areas and as a hedge against Soviet aggression. Akashi eventually established networks through Europe too, that served the Black Dragons. The Black Dragons also formed close contact and even alliances with Buddhist sects throughout Asia.
Japanese Official Radio, Radio Tokyo (NHK), sent its foreign transmissions, with some cover messages, to Japanese Doho agents outside Japan.
Hiraya Amane – secret agent in Hankow, China. Wrote Zhong-guo Bi-mi She-hui Shi, the first true history of the Triads and other secret societies; this book was a special intelligence handbook. Hiraya also organized Tung Wen College in Shanghai that trained future agents for espionage in China. The Tung Wen would continue to operate until the end of World War II, training agents for operations throughout Asia.
Marcelle Tao Kitazawa – agent in Australia, linked with Seita, who led a spy web in New Caledonia. This claim appears to have been debunked in an Axis History Forum entry by Dachhase on 13 October 2012.
Agent Umeda – local agent in North Queensland, Australia.
Kinoaki Matsuo – member of the ultra-nationalist Black Dragon secret society, and an officer in Japanese intelligence.
Mitsuru Toyama – chief of Black Dragon Society, an active agent linked with Japanese Secret Service and Japanese outside agents.
Shūmei Ōkawa – ultra-nationalist, agent instructor, and an agent in China and North Asia. [None of the "agent instructor" or "agent" claims are supported by the Wikipedia entry for Okawa dated 11 September 2017.]
Yoshio Kodama – Japanese gangster and Yakuza chief, he set up a massive network of Manchurian spies and informants spread across China.
Hideki Tojo – the Chief of the Imperial Japanese Army, Prime Minister and chief of the Kodoha Party; for a period chief of Kwantung Army and Kempeitai Intelligence service in Manchukuo. He also maintained during his military life direct control of the Japanese Secret Services (apart from the Emperor's command of such services) and received information first through his direct link with the Black Dragon Society and his own intelligence work with the Imperial Japanese Army during the conflict.
Kōki Hirota – former Foreign Minister and head of the Black Dragons (also guided intelligence services in the group), discussed the advantages and consequences of a conflict with the United States with War Minister Hideki Tōjō. In a conference on August 26, 1941, at a session of the Black Dragon Society HQ in Tokyo, the War Minister ordered preparation to be made to wage a total war against the armed forces of the United States. December 1941 or February 1942, were considered adequate time for this operation. Tojo said he "will start the war with America, and after sixty days he will reshuffle the cabinet and become a great dictator", at same time if analyzed the last dates provided from Japanese secret agents about Soviet Far East and European colonies in Southeast Asia, in relation to this operation.
Previously in World War II on the Chinese mainland, Black Dragon posed one five column, so-called "China Wave-Men". They undertook some secret operations at favour of such group. Similar operations with revolutionaries were established from 1906 to the 1940s, targeting India, the Dutch East Indies and the Philippines amongst others. The Black Dragons began establishing subsidiary groups to support these regional actions.
Kenjiro Hayashide – second secretary in Japanese Embassy in Hsinking, Diplomatic Adviser to the Kangde Emperor and underground secret agent, author of "Epochal voyage to Nippon", a publication edited by the Intelligence agency in General Affairs State Council of Manchukuo.
Michitarō Komatsubara – intelligence chief in Harbin.
Kingoro Hashimoto – served in the secret service in Manchukuo.
Sadao Araki – undertook some secret actions during the Siberian Japanese expeditionary force period
Wellington Koo – as member of Lytton Commission during his diplomatic mission in Manchukuo, reported the frequent watching of suspicious Japanese, Chinese, Korean, and White Russian employees in the Hotel Moderne, Harbin. Similarly, Amleto Vespa as a Manchu/Japanese forces secret agent, confirmed the presence of such secret agents in places where the mentioned diplomatic commission stayed in country.
Kanji Ishiwara – undertook undercover actions and espionage in Manchukuo.
Kenji Doihara – member of a Japanese intelligence service in Manchukuo, working there and in mainland China.
Noboyushi Obata (Shinryo) – chief of a secret unit in Harbin.
Masaiko Amakazu – secret agent in Manchukuo, chief of the Manchukuo Film Association.
A Japanese undercover agent, disguised as a "housekeeper" watching Puyi in the imperial palace and writing periodic reports to superiors of Japanese secret services in Manchukuo about intimate details of Kangde Emperor.
Theoretically in Manchukuo, Kangde Emperor held the command of Manchu Secret Services. In reality, these units and their sections stayed under Kempeitai and Kwantung Army control.
Amleto Vespa – Italian forced secret agent of Japanese and Manchu secret service.
In Manchukuo – Japanese and Manchu local secret services used some Chinese, Mongol, Buriats, Korean, and White Russians as secret agents and saboteurs.
Lo-Chen-Yu – a local Manchu servant with delictive links, also a secret agent.
Seishirō Itagaki – member of a Japanese intelligence service in Manchukuo and Korea.
Yasunori Yoshioka – Japanese intelligence member in Manchukuo.
A Prince – unknown identity, chief and secret agent in Japanese secret service in Manchukuo. Possibly Prince Takeda.
Konoto Daisaku – Japanese agent in Manchukuo.
Major Giga – Japanese agent and saboteur in Manchukuo.
Hisao Watari – Japanese intelligence agent in Manchukuo.
Kwantung Army – included the Asano Division, manned with White Russians; and "Mongol Army" special units, manned by Mongols. Imperial forces projected to use such units in secret missions and sabotage during eventual invasion of Soviet Siberia, Outer Mongolia, and Russian Far East.
Takayoshi Tanaka – Japanese agent with missions in north and central China.
Kanji Tsuneoka – the real power in Mengchiang, led the central academy (intelligence school) in Kalgan and undertook secret operations in the area. Directed the Kwantung Army Mongol Department, native saboteurs, and secret agent units.
Yoshiko Kawashima – Manchu princess, and Japanese secret agent in mainland China.
Pince Su – Mongol Japanese agent in Inner Mongolia.
Nataoke Sato – Japanese ambassador in Moscow, undertook some secret missions for the Axis Powers during Eastern front battles.
Jinzo Nomoto – intelligence officer sent by an Imperial Japanese Army unit to Tibet and Sinkiang. He worked in Manchukuo and was a member of Kwantung Army Mongol Department.
Ma Chung-ying – Uyghur servant who undertook some secret actions for the Japanese.
Trebitsch Lincoln – Hungarian.
Kanyei Chuyo – a chief of Imperial Japanese Navy secret services. Directed the 8th Section "Yashika." Between this unit stay the "Australian Section" ("Tokyo Gimusho") linked with Japanese Naval Intelligence Staff under command of Imperial Navy General Staff. The office had orders to research any affairs of the British Empire in Southeast Asia and Pacific Area.
Kinoaki Matsuo – Foreign Affairs Ministry official who was liaison between the Japanese Foreign Office and the Imperial Admiralty.
Mineo Ōsumi – noble and member of the Supreme War Council of Japan. He undertook some secret missions in central and southern China under the orders of the Imperial Japanese Navy.
Officer Maruyama – served in a Tokkō Censorship Department underground unit in Tokyo, Japan. He monitored information sent out of Tokyo by foreign journalists.
Japanese Secret Services – used some foreign persons as inside agents, including one American residing in Japan, one Hungarian agent in the service of the Imperial Japanese Army, and one Euroasiatic agent working for the Imperial Japanese Navy. Japanese secret service, Army, and Navy such people, along with Western and East Asian agents, during the Pacific War.
Since the 1920s, the intelligence services also used Doho or dokuku jin – (nikkei) cultural groups in the Pacific War as alternative secret agents. These were Japanese citizens with foreign nationality, with loyalty to the emperor and Japan; they lived around the world.
Tatsuki Fuji – Editor of the Singapore Herald'' and an agent in Malaya/Malaysia.
Shinozaki Mamoru – Japanese diplomat arrested for espionage.
Imperial Japanese Army – special forces agents, Susuhiko Mizuno, Sergeant Morita, Sergeant Furuhashi, Lance Corporal Kazuo Ito six sailors and five Timorese decoys, undertook secret missions from Koepang, Timor, to disembark in Western Australia, on January 19, 1944. They were members of the Matsu Kikan (Pine Tree) Secret Agency, led by Captain Masayoshi Yamamoto with HQ in Ambon (Dutch Indies), under command of 19th Army. The group traveled aboard the Hiyoshi Maru; managed by Staff Sergeant Auonuma and officer Hachiro Akai. They arrived at Cartier Island escorted by Kawasaki Ki-48 "Lilly" light bomber of 7th Air Division from Kendari, finally arriving at Browse Island. The group observed nearby areas. On January 20, 1944, the unit returned to Timor.
Australian sources mentioned a January 1944 Japanese secret mission to Mornington Island, in the Gulf of Carpentaria. Watchers inform about one large black ship landing on the island on January 15, 1944.
The Black Dragon Society, the Kaigun Kyokai (Navy League), or the Hoirusha Kai (Military Service Man's League), and other similar societies. These Japanese secret groups were well known to the US Naval Intelligence Service and the Federal Bureau of Investigation for the subversive actions in the United States among some elements of Doho communities.
Other overseas Japanese agents of Black Dragon Society were the so-called "soshi" (Brave Knights). At the same time, referring to superior commander as the "Darkside Emperor" mentioned agents since the 1940s, operating worldwide, as far away as North America, South America, and Morocco. They formed covert ties with the Nazis.
German Lt. Col. Fritz von Petersdorf, assist and German military attaché in Tokyo, received some information from Japanese Intelligence Services, in accord with Axis Powers agreements. Such information was related to military strength, transportation, reserves, troop dispositions, and movements of Soviet Far East units sent to the West European front (Operation Barbarossa), as well as data concerning the war industry in the Soviet Union. This report was supported by Admiral Wenneker, the German naval attaché, under German official Ambassador Eugen Ott in Tokyo.
Hiroshi Akita – Chief of German Section of Japanese Military Intelligence.
Imperial Japanese Army – sent a secret mission to Germany via Siberia, leaving Tokyo on March 1, 1943. This operation was led by Major General Okamoto, who had been chief of the Second Bureau (Intelligence) at the time of the outbreak of the Pacific War. His staff consisted of Colonel Kotani, Navy officer Captain Onoda, and Mr.Yosano, Foreign Office chancellor. Objectives of the mission were to investigate German ability to carry on the war; and to clarify Japan's real situation to the Germans. A third objective (concerning the arrangement of a separate peace between Germany and the Soviet Union) was eliminated just prior to the mission's departure. The Okamoto Mission reported its findings in a cable dated July 5. Many reservations were attached to the report, which concluded that German national power was lower than had been foreseen by the mission before it left Japan. Germany would accordingly encounter many difficulties in emerging triumphant without first overcoming the critical problems that were fast approaching: shortage of manpower, lowering of industrial war potential, insufficiency of liquid fuel, etc.
On October 15, 1943, IGHQ incorporated its Second Bureau's 16th Section (German and Italian Intelligence) into the 5th Section (U.S.S.R. intelligence), just as the German Army was failing in its early summer offensive against Orel. The Soviet Army, on the other hand, had seized the operational initiative. The feeling of the Imperial Japanese Army High Command was somewhat inclined to pessimism vis-a vis Germany. The Imperial Japanese Army committed a great error by placing excessive confidence in Germany. After the Allies had established a Second Front in northern France (June 1944) and a recent attempt on Hitler's (July 20 plot, 1944) - only then did the Japanese Army intelligence services and High Command conclude that Germany possessed scant prospects for victory.
Patrick Heenan (July 1910-February 13, 1942) was a Captain in the British Indian Army, who was convicted of treason, after spying for Japanese military intelligence during the Malayan campaign of World War II. Heenan was reportedly killed in a summary execution, during the Battle of Singapore. It is alleged that the British Commonwealth military censors suppressed these events.
William Forbes-Sempill, 19th Lord Sempill, a British peer and record-breaking air pioneer who passed secret information to the Japanese military before World War II.
Makihara Satoru, a Mitsubishi manager in London, was arrested on 2 August 1940 on suspicion of espionage, and taken to Brixton prison. Thanks to intervention by William Forbes-Sempill (see above), he was released a few days later due to "insufficient evidence".
Velvalee Dickinson - German American known as "The Doll Woman" who related Naval information using her New York City doll shop as a front.
John Semer Farnsworth

References

Further reading
Tony Matthews, Shadows Dancing: Japanese Espionage Against the West, 1939-1945, St. Martin's Press, New York (1993)

Politics of the Empire of Japan
1930-1945
Lists of Japanese people
Japan history-related lists